FlatIron Crossing is an enclosed shopping mall in Broomfield, Colorado, anchored by Macy's, Dillard's, and Dick's Sporting Goods. An outdoor lifestyle center, named FlatIron Village; extends out of the mall's southern side and is anchored by a 14-screen AMC Theatres cinema and several restaurants. Others stores at the mall include 2nd & Charles, Crate & Barrel, Williams Sonoma, Pottery Barn, H&M, and Old Navy.

History
FlatIron Crossing opened on August 11, 2000 after two years of construction, anchored by Lord & Taylor, Galyan's, Foley's, Dillard's, and Nordstrom. The mall's hybrid layout, with an outdoor extension attached to an indoor mall, was unique at opening and was one of the first of its kind in the United States.

In 2001, a propane-powered shuttle bus began circulating passengers free of charge between FlatIron Crossing and its adjacent shopping centers, Flatiron Marketplace and MainStreet at Flatiron. Funded by the Flatiron Improvement District sales tax surcharge, it stopped at 14 points along a  route used only by pedestrians, bicycles, and the shuttle itself. It ceased operation in 2008, and in 2015 portions of the shuttle route were repurposed for the bikeway constructed as part of the U.S. Route 36 express lanes project.

Although the mall is among the highest sales per square foot in the country , the mall had for many years after opening encountered several setbacks, particularly with the outdoor village area. The outdoor village area was originally populated by independent boutiques poached from nearby Boulder's Pearl Street Mall, alongside a Borders bookstore and several restaurants. An AMC cinema meant to anchor the Village opened more than a year late, leaving the outdoor area without a major draw and causing most of those independent tenants to leave. Structural issues caused by shifting soil beneath the Village caused other tenants to leave soon after, rendering the outdoor mall partially vacant. Many of those vacant buildings were demolished not soon after, while the bankruptcy of Borders left the outdoor mall with only the cinema and a handful of restaurants. A planned redevelopment of the village was floated in 2008, including a 140-room hotel, but was canceled in favor of a much more modest overhaul completed in 2013. In September 2022, demolition of part of the Village began as part of a $400 million redevelopment plan that will transform the mall's parking lots into mixed-use office, residential, and parks, while keeping the indoor mall and the southern portion of the Village intact.

Galyan's was acquired by Dick's Sporting Goods in 2004, leading Dick's to convert the FlatIron Crossing store to their own nameplate. Foley's was converted to Macy's in 2006, as a result of the merger between Foley's parent company May Department Stores and Macy's parent Federated Department Stores. The Lord & Taylor location also closed in 2005 citing a weak and competitive regional marketplace. In 2009, The vacant Lord & Taylor building was split into three tenants: Forever 21 on the upper level, and Ultimate Electronics and The Container Store splitting the lower level. Ultimate Electronics closed in 2011.

In May 2020, it was revealed that Nordstrom would be closing their location at Flatirons permanently as part of a plan to close 16 locations nationwide.

Anchor stores
 Macy's
 Dillard's
 Dick's Sporting Goods
 Forever 21
 The Container Store
 AMC Theatres
 Crate & Barrel

Former Anchor stores
 Lord & Taylor - closed 2005
 Ultimate Electronics - closed 2011
 Borders - closed 2011
 Nordstrom - closed 2020

References

External links
FlatIron Crossing Official Site

Buildings and structures in Broomfield, Colorado
Macerich
Shopping malls in Colorado
Tourist attractions in Broomfield, Colorado
Shopping malls established in 2000
2000 establishments in Colorado